The Tallcree Tribal Government, also called the Tallcree First Nation, is a First Nations band government in northern Alberta. It controls seven Indian reserves, the largest and most populated being Tallcree 173 (South Tallcree) and Tallcree 173A (North Tallcree). The band claims Anishinaabe ancestry, tracing its origins back to a group led to Canada by Sitting Bull.

The band owns and operates a gas station on Fort Vermilion 173B, an urban reserve adjacent to the community of Fort Vermilion.

References

First Nations governments in Alberta
Cree governments